Lesonice may refer to the following places in the Czech Republic:

 Lesonice (Třebíč District)
 Lesonice (Znojmo District)